One-Armed Bandit is the fifth studio album by the Norwegian band Jaga Jazzist. It was released January 25, 2010 by Ninja Tune to positive reviews. Compared to their earlier work, it features a substantial progressive rock influence. Different editions of the album carry different fruit symbols on the front cover.

Personnel
Lars Horntveth - Clarinet, Flute, Guitar, Piano, Clarinet (Bass), Keyboards, Programming, Sax (Baritone), Sax (Soprano), Sax (Tenor), Lap Steel Guitar
Martin Horntveth - Percussion, Drums, Programming, Bells, Psaltery, Drum Machine, Temple - Blocks, Marxophone, Mandolin Harp
Mathias Eick - Piano, Trumpet, French Horn, Keyboards, Bass (Upright)
Line Horntveth - Flute, Percussion, Tuba, Glockenspiel, Vocals
Erik Johannessen - Trombone, Marxophone
Andreas Mjos - Guitar, Percussion, Glockenspiel, Marimba, Vibraphone
Øystein Moen - Organ, Synthesizer, Percussion, Piano
Even Ormestad - Bass, Percussion, Glockenspiel, Keyboards
Stian Westerhus - Percussion, Guitar (Electric), Harp, Guitar (12 String), Effects, Guitar (Baritone)

Track listing
 "The Thing Introduces..."
 "One-Armed Bandit"
 "Bananfluer overalt"
 "220 V/Spektral"
 "Toccata"
 "Prognissekongen"
 "Book of Glass"
 "Music! Dance! Drama!"
 "Touch of Evil"
 "Endless Galaxy" (available only on LP & Japanese bonus track)

References 

2010 albums
Jaga Jazzist albums
Ninja Tune albums